Keith Hamilton may refer to:

 Keith Hamilton (American football) (born 1971), former American football defensive tackle
 Keith Hamilton (politician) (born 1936), former Australian Labor Party politician
 Keith N. Hamilton, American writer and government official

See also